Abubakar Muhammad Kasule better known as Abubakar Kasule is a Ugandan professional football player who plays for a Uganda Premier League club Express FC.

References

 Living people
Ugandan footballers
1999 births
Uganda international footballers
Association football defenders
Uganda A' international footballers
2018 African Nations Championship players
Express FC players